Plav may refer to places:

Montenegro
Plav, Montenegro, a town
Plav Municipality, a municipality
Plav (župa), historical administrative area 
Lake Plav

Czech Republic
Plav (České Budějovice District), a municipality and village